The 2001 Webby Awards were held in San Francisco at the War Memorial Opera House on July 18, 2001, hosted by Alan Cumming. The Lifetime Achievement Award, which debuted this year, went to Ray Tomlinson and Douglas Engelbart. It was the first awards held after the dot-com crash; as a result, they were smaller and quieter than in years past. The organization hired agency Diesel Design to create three ancillary sites to their main one for the 2001 ceremony, one site dedicated to award nominees, an RSVP site for guests, and a site for the winners. The agency also created print and online ads for the awards show, as well as interior signage, posters, and invitations.

Nominees and winners

(http://www.webbyawards.com/winners/2001)

Winners and nominees are generally named according to the organization or website winning the award, although the recipient is, technically, the web design firm or internal department that created the winning site and in the case of corporate websites, the designer's client.  Web links are provided for informational purposes, both in the most recently available archive.org version before the awards ceremony and, where available, the current website.  Many older websites no longer exist, are redirected, or have been substantially redesigned.

References

External links
Official website

2001
2001 awards in the United States
2001 in San Francisco
July 2001 events in the United States
2001 in Internet culture